The 1997 Scheldeprijs was the 84th edition of the Scheldeprijs cycle race and was held on 23 April 1997. The race was won by Erik Zabel of the Telekom team.

General classification

References

1997
1997 in road cycling
1997 in Belgian sport